Heinrich Bitter (fl. 1620) was an ambassador of the Bohemian estates in the Holy Roman Empire to the Ottoman Empire during the Thirty Years' War. He visited the Ottomans in Constantinople in January 1620, seeking support for the Bohemian cause against the Holy Roman Emperor.

Year of birth missing
Year of death missing
17th century in Bohemia
Ambassadors to the Ottoman Empire
1620 in the Habsburg monarchy
1620 in the Ottoman Empire